Roland D. Reed (July 7, 1894–July 15, 1972) was an American film editor, producer and director. He worked on many films for the low-budget Chesterfield Pictures and later started Roland Reed Productions, Inc. that shut down in November 1956. In addition to TV series, Reed made industrial and Christian films as well as television commercials that were filmed at Hal Roach Studios.

Personal life
The son of Daniel Morton Reed and Ella G. Hulse, Roland Daniel Reed was born in Middletown, New York. He had three wives,  Laura Muzzio (1913). Dorothy Venita Smith (1930) and Dorothy Belle Eddy (1935).

Selected filmography

 The House of Terror (1928) 10-chapter serial, now considered lost
 Notorious but Nice (1933)
 Love Is Dangerous (1933)
 The Ghost Walks (1934)
 Death from a Distance (1935)
 Manhattan Butterfly (1935)
 False Pretenses (1935)
 Red Lights Ahead (1936)
 August Weekend (1936)
 The Stu Erwin Show (1950-55)
 ABC Mystery Theater (1951-54)
 Beulah (1950-53)
 My Little Margie (1952-1955)
 Rocky Jones, Space Ranger (1953)
 Waterfront (1955)

References

Bibliography
 Michael R. Pitts. Poverty Row Studios, 1929–1940: An Illustrated History of 55 Independent Film Companies, with a Filmography for Each. McFarland & Company, 2005.

External links

1894 births
1972 deaths
Film producers from New York (state)
Artists from New York City
American film editors